Oskar Alexander Napoleon Schultz (16 September 1855, in Padasjoki – 10 March 1919) was a Finnish engineer, civil servant and politician. He was a member of the Parliament of Finland from 1907 to 1908, representing the Swedish People's Party of Finland (SFP).

References

1855 births
1919 deaths
People from Padasjoki
People from Häme Province (Grand Duchy of Finland)
Swedish-speaking Finns
Finnish people of German descent
Swedish People's Party of Finland politicians
Members of the Parliament of Finland (1907–08)